In algebra, a nice subgroup H of an abelian p-group G is a subgroup such that pα(G/H) = 〈pαG,H〉/H for all ordinals α.

References

 
 
 

Properties of groups